Zbigniew Podlecki (19 January 1940 – 8 January 2009) was a Polish motorcycle speedway rider who won Team World Champion title in 1965. He was born in Vilnius, Lithuania.

His career ended in 1972 when he had a road accident. He died in Gdańsk in January 2009. His team Wybrzeże Gdańsk named their stadium after him and it i snow called the Stadium Zbigniew Podlecki.

World Final Appearances

Individual World Championship
 1964 -  Göteborg, Ullevi - 14th - 3pts
 1969 -  London, Wembley Stadium - Reserve - 3pts

World Team Cup
 1964 -  Abensberg, Abensberg Stadion (with Andrzej Pogorzelski / Andrzej Wyglenda / Marian Kaiser / Marian Rose) - 4th - 16pts (3)
 1965 -  Kempten (with Andrzej Wyglenda / Antoni Woryna / Andrzej Pogorzelski) - Winner - 28pts (7)
 1967 -  Malmö, Malmö Stadion (with Jerzy Trzeszkowski / Andrzej Pogorzelski / Andrzej Wyglenda / Antoni Woryna) - 2nd - 26pts (3)

See also
 Poland national speedway team
 Speedway in Poland

References

External links 
Podlecki at LotosGdansk.pl 

1940 births
2009 deaths
Polish speedway riders
Sportspeople from Vilnius
Sportspeople from Gdańsk